Abdol Khan-e Pain (also Romanized as ‘Abdol Khān-e Pā'īn; also known as ‘Abdol Khān and Abdollāh Khān-e-Pā’īn) is a village in Abdol Khan Rural District, Shavur District, Shush County, Khuzestan Province, Iran. At the 2006 census, its population was 2,631, in 422 families.

References 

Populated places in Shush County